In mathematics, Zolotarev polynomials are polynomials used in approximation theory.  They are sometimes used as an alternative to the Chebyshev polynomials where accuracy of approximation near the origin is of less importance.  Zolotarev polynomials differ from the Chebyshev polynomials in that two of the coefficients are fixed in advance rather than allowed to take on any value.  The Chebyshev polynomials of the first kind are a special case of Zolotarev polynomials.  These polynomials were introduced by Russian mathematician Yegor Ivanovich Zolotarev in 1868.

Definition and properties

A subset of Zolotarev polynomials can be expressed in terms of Chebyshev polynomials of the first kind, .  For

 

then

 

For values of  greater than the maximum of this range, Zolotarev polynomials can be expressed in terms of elliptic functions. For , the Zolotarev polynomial is identical to the equivalent Chebyshev polynomial.

The Zolotarev polynomial can be expanded into a sum of Chebyshev polynomials using the relationship

In terms of Jacobi elliptic functions 
The original solution to the approximation problem given by Zolotarev was in terms of Jacobi elliptic functions. Zolotarev gave the general solution where the number of zeroes to the left of the peak value in the interval  is not equal to the number of zeroes to the right of this peak. For many applications,  is used and then only  need be considered. The general Zolotarev polynomials are defined as

where
 
 
  is the Jacobi eta function
  is the incomplete elliptic integral of the first kind
  is the quarter-wave complete elliptic integral of the first kind.  That is, 
  is the Jacobi elliptic modulus
  is the Jacobi elliptic sine.

The variation of the function within the interval [−1,1] is equiripple except for one peak which is larger than the rest.  The position and width of this peak can be set independently.  The position of the peak is given by

where
  is the Jacobi elliptic cosine
  is the Jacobi delta amplitude
  is the Jacobi zeta function
  is as defined above.

The height of the peak is given by

where
 is the incomplete elliptic integral of the third kind

 is the position on the left limb of the peak which is the same height as the equiripple peaks.

Jacobi eta function 
The Jacobi eta function can be defined in terms of a Jacobi auxiliary theta function,

where,

Applications 
The polynomials were introduced by Yegor Ivanovich Zolotarev in 1868 as a means of uniformly approximating polynomials of degree  on the interval [−1,1]. In 1868, Zolotarev showed that  could be approximated with a polynomial of degree at most , two degrees lower. The error in Zolotarev's method is given by,

The procedure was further developed by Naum Achieser in 1956.

Zolotarev polynomials are used in the design of Achieser-Zolotarev filters.  They were first used in this role in 1970 by Ralph Levy in the design of microwave waveguide filters.  Achieser-Zolotarev filters are similar to Chebyshev filters in that they have an equal ripple attenuation through the passband, except that the attenuation exceeds the preset ripple for the peak closest to the origin.

Zolotarev polynomials can be used to synthesise the  radiation patterns of linear antenna arrays, first suggested by D.A. McNamara in 1985.  The work was based on the filter application with beam angle used as the variable instead of frequency.  The Zolotarev beam pattern has equal-level sidelobes.

References

Bibliography 
 Achieser, Naum, Hymnan, C.J. (trans), Theory of Approximation, New York: Frederick Ungar Publishing, 1956.  Dover reprint 2013 .
 Beebe, Nelson H.F., The Mathematical-Function Computation Handbook, Springer, 2017 .
 Cameron, Richard J.; Kudsia, Chandra M.; Mansour, Raafat R., Microwave Filters for Communication Systems, John Wiley & Sons, 2018 .
 Hansen, Robert C., Phased Array Antennas, Wiley, 2009 .
 McNamara, D.A., "Optimum monopulse linear array excitations using Zolotarev Polynomials", Electron, vol. 21, iss. 16, pp. 681–682, August 1985.
 Newman, D.J., Reddy, A.R., "Rational approximations to  II", Canadian Journal of Mathematics, vol. 32, no. 2, pp. 310–316, April 1980.
 Pinkus, Allan, "Zolotarev polynomials", in, Hazewinkel, Michiel (ed), Encyclopaedia of Mathematics, Supplement III, Springer Science & Business Media, 2001 .
 Vlček, Miroslav, Unbehauen, Rolf, "Zolotarev polynomials and optimal FIR filters", IEEE Transactions on Signal Processing, vol. 47 , iss. 3, pp. 717–730, March 1999 (corrections July 2000).
 Zahradnik, Pavel; Vlček, Miroslav, "Analytical design of 2-D narrow bandstop FIR filters", pp. 56–63 in, Computational Science — ICCS 2004: Proceedings of the 4th International Conference, Bubak, Marian; van Albada, Geert D.; Sloot, Peter M.A.; Dongarra, Jack (eds), Springer Science & Business Media, 2004 .

Polynomials
Approximation theory